Long Lake is  lake in the U.S. state of Michigan. The lake is within two counties Alpena County and Presque Isle County in Northern Michigan. The lake is the 20th largest inland lake in Michigan.

In Presque Isle County, the lake extends into Presque Isle Township and Krakow Township.

The lake is adjoined by an Alpena County park (including a day-use beach).  Fish species include largemouth bass, smallmouth bass, northern pike, pumpkinseed sunfish, rock bass, yellow perch, walleye, and whitefish.

The name "Long Lake" is common among Michigan's 11,037 inland lakes which cover  of inland water.  This should not be confused with the other current and former Long lakes in Michigan, including the one in the vicinity of Long Lake Township, which is near Traverse City on the opposite side of the Lower Peninsula of Michigan.

References

External links

Lakes of Michigan